Fernando (Darda) del Castillo (born Rosario, 16 January 1971) is a former Argentine rugby union player. He played as a centre.

He played for Jockey Club de Rosario.

He had 6 caps for Argentina, from 1995 to 1998, without ever scoring. He had his debut at the 29-26 win over Canada, for the Pan American Championship, at 10 March 1995, in Buenos Aires. He was called for the 1995 Rugby World Cup, but never left the bench. His last game was at the 55-0 win over Uruguay, for the 1999 Rugby World Cup qualifyings, at 18 August 1998, in Buenos Aires.

References

External links

1971 births
Living people
Argentine rugby union players
Argentina international rugby union players
Jockey Club de Rosario players
Rugby union centres
Argentina international rugby sevens players
Sportspeople from Rosario, Santa Fe